Peter Mikkelsen may refer to:

Peter Mikkelsen (referee) (1960–2019), Danish association football referee
Peter Mikkelsen (badminton) (born 1982), Danish badminton player
Peter Nymann Mikkelsen, Danish footballer

See also
Pete Mikkelsen (1939–2006), American baseball player